Nika Godun (born 4 March 1997) is a Russian competitive swimmer. She is a Russian record holder in the short course 4×50 metre medley relay and the 4×100 metre medley relay. She competed at the 2019 and 2021 European Short Course Championships, medaling in the 4×50 metre medley relay and 50 metre breaststroke. At the 2021 World Short Course Championships she placed fifth in the 50 metre breaststroke and the 4×100 metre medley relay, and sixth in the 100 metre breaststroke and the 4×50 metre medley relay.

Background
Godun was born 4 March 1997 in Moscow, Russia.

Career

2012–2016
At the 2012 European Junior Swimming Championships, held in Antwerp, Belgium in July 2012, Godun won a gold medal as part of the 4×100 metre medley relay for her efforts swimming the breaststroke leg of the relay in the prelims heats.

In September 2016, at the 2016 Swimming World Cup stop in Moscow, Godun started competition on the first of two days with the prelims heats of the 100 metre breaststroke, where she placed 11th overall with a time of 1:11.05. Later the same morning, she placed 11th in the 50 metre backstroke with a time of 28.99 seconds in the prelims heats. In the evening, Godun swam the butterfly leg of the 4×50 metre medley relay to help achieve a fifth-place finish in 1:45.77, splitting a 27.62. The following day, she swam a 32.27 in the prelims heats of the 50 metre breaststroke to place 11th overall.

2019
For the 2019 World University Games in Naples, Italy at Piscina Felice Scandone in July, Godun placed 13th in the 100 metre breaststroke with a time of 1:08.90 in the semifinals. She also placed tenth with a time of 31.60 seconds in the semifinals of the 50 metre breaststroke.

2019 European Short Course Championships

On the first day of competition at the 2019 European Short Course Swimming Championships in Glasgow, Scotland in December 2019, Godun tied Mona McSharry of Ireland for ninth rank in the prelims heats of the 50 metre breaststroke with a time of 30.51 seconds. For the semifinals in the afternoon of the same day, Godun swam a 30.57 and tied Tatiana Chișca of Moldova for 12th-place overall. Day three of competition, Godun ranked fourth in the prelims heats of the 100 metre breaststroke with a 1:05.41 and qualified for the semifinals later in the day. In the semifinals, she qualified for the final with a time of 1:05.20 that ranked her fifth overall in the semifinals. The following day, Godun placed seventh in the final of the 100 metre breaststroke with a time of 1:05.40. On the fifth and final day of competition, Godun helped advance the 4×50 metre medley relay to the final ranking first in the prelims heats with a 1:45.81, splitting a 30.26 for the breaststroke leg of the relay. In the evening final, she split a 30.11 for the breaststroke leg and contributed to the final relay time of 1:44.96 to win the bronze medal and set a new Russian record in the event.

2021

2021 Swimming World Cup
At the second stop of the 2021 Swimming World Cup, held at Danube Arena in Budapest, Hungary in October, Godun won a bronze medal in the 100 metre individual medley with a personal best time of 59.71 seconds on the first day of competition, which was less than one-tenth of a second slower than silver medalist Michelle Coleman of Sweden. The second day of competition, Godun won the gold medal in the 100 metre breaststroke with a 1:04.71 and finished over six-tenths of a second ahead of the silver medalist in the event, Lydia Jacoby of the United States. On the third and final day of competition at the Budapest stop, she won the gold medal in the 50 metre breaststroke in 29.81 seconds, this time finishing 0.16 seconds ahead of second-place finisher Lydia Jacoby. Godun returned to the World Cup circuit at the fourth and final stop, held at the Palace of Water Sports in Kazan, where she competed in the 50 metre breaststroke and won the gold medal with a time of 29.64 seconds to finish 0.01 seconds ahead of the silver medalist and fellow Russian Yuliya Yefimova.

2021 European Short Course Championships

In November 2021, at the 2021 European Short Course Swimming Championships in Kazan, Godun placed fourth in her first event, the 100 metre breaststroke, with a time of 1:04.67 that was less than half a second slower than bronze medalist in the event, Eneli Jefimova of Estonia. For her second event of the Championships, the 200 metre breaststroke, Godun placed tenth in the prelims heats with a 2:23.17 and did not advance to the semifinals stage of competition as she was not one of the two fastest Russians in the event. The same day as the 200 metre breaststroke, Godun split a 29.47 for the breaststroke leg of the 4×50 metre medley relay, contributing to the final time of 1:44.19, which won the relay team the gold medal and set a new Russian record. In her final event of the Championships, the 50 metre breaststroke, she won the bronze medal with a time of 29.80 seconds, finishing less than two-tenths of a second behind the gold and silver medalists in the event, Arianna Castiglioni and Benedetta Pilato, both of Italy.

2021 World Short Course Championships
Leading up to the 2021 World Short Course Championships, Godun swam a personal best time of 1:03.77 in the 100 metre breaststroke at the 2021 Russian Short Course Championships and became the second-fastest female Russian swimmer in the event behind Yuliya Yefimova. The Court of Arbitration for Sport enacted a reactionary ban against Russians starting 17 December 2020 and ending 16 December 2022, after allegations that Russians all across the country were doping, which required her and all other Russians going to the World Championships to compete under a name different than their country name, Russian Swimming Federation in this case, and without their national anthem and flag.

At the World Championships, held at Etihad Arena in Abu Dhabi, United Arab Emirates in December, Godun ranked first in the semifinals of the 50 metre breaststroke, following the disqualification of Alia Atkinson of Jamaica, with a personal best time of 29.42 seconds. In the final the following day, she placed fifth with a time of 29.79 seconds. Earlier in the same finals session, she helped the 4×50 metre medley relay place sixth in 1:44.51, splitting a 29.56 for the breaststroke leg of the relay. In the final of the 100 metre breaststroke three days later, she placed sixth in 1:04.43. For her final event of the Championships, the 4×100 metre medley relay, she split a 1:04.53 for the breaststroke leg of the finals relay, which was the third-fastest breaststroke leg in the final only behind Sophie Hansson of Sweden and Qianting Tang of China, and helped achieve a new Russian record time of 3:49.94 and a fifth-place finish.

2022: Double ban for being Russian
In 2022, the development of her senior international career was stunted first by LEN, the European governing body for aquatic sport, which banned her and all other Russians and Belarusians from their competitions indefinitely, at least for the foreseeable future, effective immediately on 3 March. Then on 21 April, she was denied the opportunity to improve upon her placings and times from the 2021 World Short Course Championships when she and all Russians and Belarusians were banned from FINA competitions by FINA through 31 December, which included the 2022 World Aquatics Championships and the 2022 World Short Course Championships. Her times achieved between 21 April and 31 December 2022 at various non-FINA competitions did not count for FINA world rankings or world records, same as the times achieved by her fellow Russians.

Developing her competition experience nationally instead, Godun won the gold medal in the 100 metre breaststroke at the 2022 Russian Championships in April with a personal best time of 1:06.66. She also competed at the long course metres swimming portion of the 2022 Russian Solidarity Games in July, a multi-sport and multi-country competition broken into two parts, winning the silver medal in the 100 metre breaststroke with a 1:06.81. At the second part of the Games, held in November in Kazan, she achieved a personal best time of 58.68 seconds in the final of the 100 metre individual medley and won the gold medal. In the 100 metre breaststroke, she won the silver medal with a personal best time of 1:03.71. For the final of the 200 metre breaststroke, she lowered her personal best time to a 2:19.94 and won the bronze medal, finishing 5.24 seconds behind the gold medalist.

International championships

 Godun swam only in the prelims heats.

Personal best times

Short course metres (25 m pool)

Short course metres (25 m pool)

Legend: sf – semifinal

National records

Short course metres (25 m pool)

See also
 List of European Short Course Swimming Championships medalists (women)

References

External links
 

1997 births
Living people
Swimmers from Moscow
Russian female breaststroke swimmers
Russian female medley swimmers
Competitors at the 2019 Summer Universiade